Miss Europe 1981 was the 41st edition of the Miss Europe pageant and the 30th edition under the Mondial Events Organization. It was held in Birmingham, England, United Kingdom on 9 June 1981. Anne Mette Larsen of Denmark, was crowned Miss Europe 1981 by out going titleholder Karin Zorn of Austria.

Results

Placements

Special awards

Contestants 

 - Edda Schnell
 - Else Desplenter
 - Rolly Stylianidou
 - Anne Mette Larsen
 - Joanna Longley
 - Eija Helena Korolainen
 - Isabelle Sophie Benard
 - Edith Maciejek
 - Maria Pilar Wahnon
 - Natassa Zanthopoulou (Natasa Xanthopoulou)
 - Ingrid Johanna Maria Schouten
 - Elísabet Traustadóttir
 - Valerie "Vicki" Roe
 - Anna Maria Kanakis
 - Mona Olsen
 - Anne McFarlane
 - María Agustina García Alcaide
 - Eva-Lena Lundgren
 - Jolanda Egger
 - Ayşegül Ercan
 - Karen Ruth Stannard

Notes

Debuts

Returns

Withdrawals

References

External links 
 

Miss Europe
1981 beauty pageants
1981 in England
1981 in the United Kingdom